The Micro, Small and Medium Enterprises Development Act, 2006 is an Act of the Parliament of India. According to the act, "any buyer who fails to make payment to MSMEs, as per agreed terms or a maximum of 45 days, would be liable to pay monthly compounded interest at three times the bank rate notified by RBI".
Industries are divided into 2 categories. Manufacturing and services. They are further divided into micro, small and medium. For both, manufacturing and services sectors, micro industries' capital requirements are under 1 Crore rupees and an annual turnover of less than 5 Crore rupees. Small industries shall have cis 50 and 250 Crores respectively.

References
2. What's MSME | Ministry of Micro, Small & Medium Enterprises

Acts of the Parliament of India 2006